Group D of UEFA Euro 2008 was played from 10 to 18 June 2008. All six group matches were played at venues in Austria, in Innsbruck and Salzburg. The group was composed of UEFA Euro 2004 winners and reigning champions Greece, as well as Sweden, Spain and Russia. Greece, Spain and Russia had all been drawn together in the same group in the previous European Championship as well.

Following a 4–1 win over Russia in their first game, Spain qualified for the quarter-finals with a 2–1 victory against Sweden in their second. They clinched top spot after Russia beat Greece later that day, condemning the title holders to last place in the group. The second quarter-final berth was to be decided by the Sweden-Russia match, with Sweden only needing to avoid defeat to go through. However, Russia scored a goal in each half to beat Sweden 2–0 and qualify for the quarter-finals. Meanwhile, despite going behind towards the end of the first half, Spain scored two second half goals, one coming three minutes before full time, to become the third team in the tournament to qualify for the quarter-finals with a 100% group stage record.

Teams

Notes

Standings

In the quarter-finals,
The winner of Group D, Spain, advanced to play the runner-up of Group C, Italy.
The runner-up of Group D, Russia, advanced to play the winner of Group C, Netherlands.

Matches

Spain vs Russia

Greece vs Sweden

Sweden vs Spain

Greece vs Russia

Greece vs Spain

Russia vs Sweden

References

External links
UEFA Euro 2008 Group D

Group D
Sweden at UEFA Euro 2008
Russia at UEFA Euro 2008
Group
Greece at UEFA Euro 2008